Lad from Our Town, is a 1942 Soviet drama film directed by Boris Ivanov and Aleksandr Stolper.

Plot 
The film tells about Saratovite Sergey Lukonin, who goes to a tank school in Omsk, leaving his bride in the city, who becomes an actress. In 1936 Sergei was sent to the front in Spain. After surviving the wounds, captivity and escape, Sergei does not even imagine that the Great Patriotic War is ahead of him.

Starring 
 Nikolai Kryuchkov as Sergei Lukonin
 Nikolay Bogolyubov as Dr. Arkady Andreyevich Burmin
 Lidiya Smirnova as Varya Lukonina-Burmina
 Vladimir Kandelaki as Vano Guliashvili
 Nikolay Mordvinov as Aleksei Petrovich Vasnetsov
 Nina Zorskaya as Zhenya Burmin
 V. Stepanov as Sevostyanov
 Valery Medvedev as Petka
 Aleksandr Rumnev as translator
 Pyotr Lyubeshkin as Safonov
 Anatoly Alekseyev as Volodya
 Grigory Shpigel as German officer (uncredited)

References

External links 
 

1942 films
1940s Russian-language films
Soviet drama films
1942 drama films
Soviet black-and-white films
Films directed by Boris Ivanov
World War II films